Leptoscela is a genus of flowering plants belonging to the family Rubiaceae.

Its native range is Northeastern Brazil.

Species:
 Leptoscela ruellioides Hook.f.

References

Rubiaceae
Rubiaceae genera